John Brooks is an English retired soccer forward who played professionally in the Major Indoor Soccer League.

Brooks was recruited by San Francisco Dons coach Stephen Negoesco to attend the University of San Francisco. Brooks was visiting his brother Adrian in the United States when Negoesco spotted him. Brooks would play for the Dons from 1976 to 1979, winning the 1976 and 1978 NCAA Men's Division I Soccer Championship with them. He is a member of the USF Dons Athletic Hall of Fame. Brooks turned professional in the fall of 1979 when he signed with the Cleveland Force of Major Indoor Soccer League. He played only nine games and moved to the San Francisco Fog for the 1980–1981 season. In February 1983, he signed with the Golden Bay Earthquakes of MISL. In his first game with the Earthquakes, he lost his hearing when heading the ball. He later sued the Earthquakes. He later coached the Dominican University of California soccer team for fourteen seasons.

References

External links
MISL stats

1956 births
Living people
Cleveland Force (original MISL) players
Dominican University of California
English footballers
English expatriate footballers
San Jose Earthquakes (1974–1988) players
Major Indoor Soccer League (1978–1992) players
College men's soccer coaches in the United States
San Francisco Dons men's soccer players
San Francisco Fog (MISL) players
Association football forwards
Footballers from Derby
English expatriate sportspeople in the United States
Expatriate soccer players in the United States
English football managers